Krešimir Arapović (23 November 1924 – 17 July 1994) was a Croatian football player and manager.

Biography
Born in Čapljina, Mostar Oblast, in the Kingdom of Yugoslavia, he became a trophy winning HNK Hajduk Split player and coach. He played mostly as an offensive right-winger.

He started playing football while with the Partisans during the Second World War. In 1945 he became a player of NK Neretva where he played one season. In 1947 he started wearing the white shirt of Hajduk Split which he wore all the way until 1954. Nicknamed "Arap", he played with Hajduk a total of 216 matches having scored 81 goals, winning two national titles, in 1950 and 1952.

He leaves Split in direction of Sremska Mitrovica where he becomes player/manager of FK Srem. He earns his coaching diploma in Belgrade in 1961 and becomes the manager of Yugoslav Second League club RFK Novi Sad. Afterwards, he coached the youth team of Hajduk Split in a period when the club was giving much emphasis to working and discovering young talents throughout the lower leagues. He was also the assistant manager of Milovan Ćirić during the 1963–64 season. Arapović insisted in the creation within the club of a B team where the reserve and younger players would gain the necessary experience, a practice which ended up being very successful, with many players from his team becoming regular starters in the main team in future. For a short period during June 1964 he was the club's main coach.

In his coaching career he also managed NK Troglav Livno, RNK Split, FK Sloboda Užice, FK Borac Banja Luka and Sloga Mravinci.

He died on July 17, 1994, in Split and was buried in the city cemetery Lovrinac.

Honours
Hajduk Split
Yugoslav First League: 1950, 1952

References

1924 births
1994 deaths
People from Čapljina
Croats of Bosnia and Herzegovina
Yugoslav footballers
Association football midfielders
NK Neretva players
HNK Hajduk Split players
FK Srem players
Yugoslav football managers
FK Borac Banja Luka managers